Nana Hill Kagga Macpherson (also known as Nana Kagga-Hill or as Nana Hill or Nana Hill Kagga) 
is a Ugandan actress, filmmaker, content creator, scriptwriter, petroleum engineer and motivational speaker. She wrote and directed the 2012 film The Life and was a writer and executive producer of Beneath the Lies - The Series.

Life and background
Kagga was born in Nairobi, Kenya to Ugandan parents, one an engineer. Kagga is a Muganda and part of the traditional ruling clan of the Baganda tribe, the ‘Bambejja’ (princesses). Kagga is the third of six children of both her parents. At the time of her birth, her parents were in exile during the regime of President Idi Amin. Kagga grew up primarily in Uganda in a well-to-do family. In addition to her father and maternal grandfather, four of her siblings are also engineers. Kagga resides in Kampala, Uganda with her 3 children. She is fluent in English and Luganda.

Education
Kagga completed her Primary education at Kampala Parents School. She then joined Gayaza High School, one of the most prestigious girl's schools in Uganda, for her O-Levels. She then did her A-Levels at Red Maids School, Bristol, the oldest Girls’ School in the UK. Kagga then joined the University of Birmingham, Birmingham, UK where she attained a bachelor's degree in chemical engineering. Kagga was an excellent all-round student who excelled in sciences, arts and sports. During her summer holidays, she would return to Uganda and was a presenter for Jam Agenda on WBS, a popular Ugandan TV show.

Career

Engineering
Following her graduation, Kagga moved to Florida, United States, then New Mexico, United States. In New Mexico, she worked at Laguna Industries as a Process Engineer in Laguna working on US Military contracts.

Hollywood (as Nana Hill)
Kagga decided to move to pursue her acting and presenting in Los Angeles and enjoyed some success. Kagga was cast in a number of films including Cowboys and Indians, A Good Day to Be Black and Sexy (Segment ‘Reprise’), He's Just Not That into You, Star Trek, CSI: NY – Boo, Life, Runway Stars. In US Theatre, Kagga was cast as Mercy in the play, Butterflies of Uganda by Darren Dahms which was nominated for an NAACP award.
Kagga appeared in several music videos by P!nk, Amy Winehouse, Sting, Lenny Kravitz.
Kagga also appeared in several TV ads including for KFC, Coors Light, Pepsi, DSW, Microsoft, APPLE, Tylenol, DOVE.
While in L.A, Kagga also owned a vintage and resale store on Santa Monica Blvd called A Vintage Affair.

In Uganda
Kagga moved back to Uganda in late 2009 and set up a business, Savannah MOON Ltd. Savannah MOON under the brand, Savannah MOON Productions hproduced a full-length feature film, The Life which was shown on M-NET, a TV Series Beneath The Lies - The Series, which is currently being shown on Urban TV and digitally distributed by MTN Uganda and a TV Program, How We See It. Savannah MOON has also co-produced a short film called The Last Breath with Kampala Film School. Savannah MOON is currently working on developing several concepts and content including Taking Time, an upcoming TV series.

Kagga has created an initiative, You are Limitless (YAL), which aims to motivate, guide and encourage Africans, especially the youth to achieve their full potential. Kagga also works as a Petroleum Engineer for one of the large Oil & Gas companies operating in Uganda. She was one of the judges for Miss Uganda 2018.

Filmography

As an actress

Film

Television

Theater

As a crew member

Awards

References

External links
 
 
 Nana Kagga Facebook Profile

Living people
Ugandan film actresses
Ugandan television actresses
People from Kampala
Ugandan television presenters
Ugandan television personalities
21st-century Ugandan actresses
Ugandan film producers
Ugandan women film producers
Ugandan film directors
Ugandan screenwriters
Women screenwriters
Ugandan stage actresses
1979 births
Ugandan women engineers
Ugandan engineers
Ugandan chemical engineers
Alumni of the University of Birmingham
People educated at The Red Maids' School
People educated at Gayaza High School
21st-century women engineers
Ugandan women television presenters
21st-century screenwriters